The 2004 Stratford-on-Avon District Council election took place on 10 June 2004 to elect members of Stratford-on-Avon District Council in Warwickshire, England. One third of the council was up for election and the Conservative Party stayed in overall control of the council.

After the election, the composition of the council was
Conservative 30
Liberal Democrat 20
Independent 3

Background
19 of the 53 seats on the council were contested in the election. The Conservatives were defending 11 of the seats and this was seen as giving the Liberal Democrats a chance at taking over control of the council, which had a one-seat Conservative majority before the election. Meanwhile, Labour had their only remaining council seat up for election in Southam ward, leading to the possibility that they could fail to be represented on the council after the election.

Election result
The results saw the Conservatives strengthen their majority on the council up to 7 seats. They gained 4 seats in Harbury, Southam, Stratford Guild and Hathaway and Wellesbourne wards and only suffered 1 loss to the Liberal Democrats in Studley. While the Liberal Democrats lost ground as a result, the defeat in Southam meant Labour was no longer represented on the council.

The Conservatives said they were pleased with the results, that saw them win almost half of the vote, and which they put down to a strong positive campaign. Overall turnout in the election was higher than the national average at 43.5%.

Ward results

References

2004 English local elections
2004
2000s in Warwickshire